Orkan Çınar (born 29 January 1996) is a Turkish footballer who plays as a winger.

Club career 
Çınar joined SpVgg Greuther Fürth in 2014 from VfL Wolfsburg. He made his 2. Bundesliga debut at 24 August 2014 against FC Ingolstadt 04. He replaced Tom Weilandt after 77 minutes in a 2-0 away loss.

References

External links
 
 
 
 

Living people
1996 births
Footballers from Dortmund
Turkish footballers
Turkey youth international footballers
German footballers
Turkish people of Abkhazian descent
German people of Turkish descent
Association football midfielders
Füchse Berlin Reinickendorf players
Tennis Borussia Berlin players
VfL Wolfsburg players
SpVgg Greuther Fürth players
Gaziantepspor footballers
Beşiktaş J.K. footballers
Konyaspor footballers
Adana Demirspor footballers
MKE Ankaragücü footballers
Adanaspor footballers
Süper Lig players
TFF First League players
Regionalliga players
2. Bundesliga players